General elections were held in British Honduras (now Belize) on 1 March 1965. Belizeans elected 18 members to the British Honduras Legislative Assembly.

The ruling People's United Party (PUP) won 16 of 18 seats in the elections. However, the opposition National Independence Party entered the Legislative Assembly for the first time in the election, with party leader Philip Goldson winning in the Albert constituency and Edwin Morey winning in Toledo North.

Results

By division

References 

British H
British H
General elections in Belize
1965 in British Honduras
British H